Jehanzeb Khalil is a Pakistani academic, currently serving as Pro-Vice-Chancellor of Abdul Wali Khan University Mardan. He has also served as dean at the Hazara University and dean of Social Sciences at Abdul Wali Khan University Mardan. Khalil has got PhD in Pakistan Studies from the University of Peshawar. He is also a faculty member of the political science department at Abdul Wali Khan University Mardan.

References

Living people
University of Peshawar alumni
Pakistani academic administrators
Vice-Chancellors of the Abdul Wali Khan University Mardan
Year of birth missing (living people)